The Love Match is a 1955 British black and white comedy film directed by David Paltenghi and starring Arthur Askey, Glenn Melvyn, Thora Hird and Shirley Eaton. A football-mad railway engine driver and his fireman are desperate to get back in time to see a match. It was based on the 1953 play by Glenn Melvyn, one of the stars of the film. A TV spin-off series Love and Kisses, appeared later in 1955.

Cast
 Arthur Askey as Bill Brown
 Glenn Melvyn as Wally Binns
 Thora Hird as Sal Brown
 Shirley Eaton as Rose Brown
 James Kenney as Percy Brown
 Edward Chapman as Mr. Longworth
 Danny Ross as Alf Hall
 Robb Wilton as Mr. Muddlecombe
 Anthea Askey as Vera
 Patricia Hayes as Emma Binns
 Iris Vandeleur as Mrs. Entwhistle
 William Franklyn as Arthur Ford
 Leonard Williams as Aggressive Man
 Peter Swanwick as Mr. Hall
 Dorothy Blythe as Waitress
 Reginald Hearne as Police Constable Wilfred
 Maurice Kaufmann as Harry Longworth
Janet Davies as Motorist

Release

Box Office
According to the National Film Finance Corporation, the film made a comfortable profit. According to Kinematograph Weekly it was a "money maker" at the British box office in 1955.

Critical reception
TV Guide noted a "highly enjoyable farce"; while Britmovie called it a "boisterous Lancashire comedy with a rapid succession of old jokes."

References

External links

1955 films
1955 comedy films
Films directed by David Paltenghi
British comedy films
1950s English-language films
1950s British films
British black-and-white films